For information on all Davidson College sports, see Davidson Wildcats

The Davidson Wildcats men's soccer team is a varsity intercollegiate athletic team of Davidson College in Davidson, North Carolina, United States. The team is a member of the Atlantic 10 Conference, which is part of the National Collegiate Athletic Association's Division I. Davidson's first men's soccer team was fielded in 1956. The team plays its home games at Alumni Soccer Stadium in Davidson, North Carolina. The Wildcats are coached by Mike Babst.

Current squad

Seasons 

Source:

NCAA tournament results 

Davidson has appeared in two NCAA tournaments.

Achievements 
 Southern Conference Men's Soccer Tournament: 5
 Champion : 1970, 1971, 1992, 1995, 2003
 Runner-Up: 1967, 1969, 1981, 1983, 2004, 2005
 Southern Conference Regular Season: 7
 Champion : 1970, 1971, 1992, 1994, 1995, 2003, 2005
 Runner-Up: 1968, 1969, 1981, 1987, 1997, 2000, 2001

Notable players
 Matt Pacifici (born 1993)
 Charlie Reiter (born 1988)

References

External links 
 

 
Soccer clubs in North Carolina
1956 establishments in North Carolina
Association football clubs established in 1956